The Tenjin River (天神川) is a river in Tottori Prefecture, Japan. There are approximately 120 sakura trees along the river. Visitors can take part in hanami (flower-viewing party) which is held each year.

References

Rivers of Tottori Prefecture
Rivers of Japan